La Araña (Spanish for "the Spider") may refer to:

 Julián Álvarez (born 2000), Argentine footballer
 Roberto Vásquez (born 1984), Mexican-American boxer
 "La araña", a 2022 song by Jimena Barón

See also
 Araña (Anya Corazon), a comic book superhero